Stranger Things: Music from the Netflix Original Series, Season 3 is the non-original composition soundtrack companion to the third season of the Netflix series Stranger Things. The album, which includes fifteen popular songs paired with an original cast recording from the third season, was released on July 5, 2019, by Legacy Recordings to coincide with the release of the third season. Certain variant special vinyl editions of the album come with an additional 7-inch single and other features, such as posters, stickers, puzzles, and more.

Track listing

Charts

Release history

References

Music of Stranger Things
Television soundtracks
2019 soundtrack albums
2019 compilation albums